The Unuk River is a river in the U.S. state of Alaska and the Canadian province of British Columbia. It flows from the Coast Mountains southwest to Behm Canal, northeast of Ketchikan, Alaska.

In Alaska the river flows through the Misty Fjords National Monument.

In Tlingit it is called Joonáx̱, the meaning of which is obscure but may have to do with dreaming (cf. aawajoon “he dreamed”). It is occasionally referred to as Oonáx̱, which is a reduced form. The USGS reports that a 1906 publication said the correct name for the river is “Junuk” or “Junock”, but it is unclear whether the initial sound is supposed to be an affricate  or an approximant . The former sound would reflect the full Tlingit name, the latter the English adaptation.

The Unuk River supports relatively large runs of salmon, including chinook, coho, pink, chum, and sockeye.

References

The name Unuk is derived from the Tlingit name for the area, Joonáxh (Place of Dreams).

External links
 

Rivers of Ketchikan Gateway Borough, Alaska
Rivers of Alaska
Rivers of the Boundary Ranges
Stikine Country
International rivers of North America